Georgia Craig (born March 20, 1979 in Vancouver, British Columbia) is a Canadian actress. She pursued classical studies at Montreal's National Theatre School of Canada, graduating in 2001. She worked as a pollster and bartender before her first movie appearance in How to Lose a Guy in 10 Days in 2003.

Craig is known to science fiction fans from her roles as Sabrina Gosling in the Stargate SG-1 episode "Moebius" and as Oracle Yolanda Brenn in the reimagined Battlestar Galactica.

Craig was a casting associate working on the CBC Television drama Arctic Air. Georgia Craig was passionate about acting from a young age. Then She pursued classical studies at Montreal’s National Theatre School of Canada, graduating in 2001.

Filmography

Film

Television

References

External links

1979 births
Actresses from Vancouver
Canadian film actresses
Canadian television actresses
Living people
National Theatre School of Canada alumni